Commandos 3: Destination Berlin is a real-time tactics video game and the third installment of the Commandos series. It was developed by Pyro Studios and published by Eidos Interactive in October 2003 for Windows. The game is the first in the series to use a true 3D engine as well as introduce deathmatch multiplayer mode, and the last to use real-time tactics before the series shifted towards the first-person shooter genre.

The Mac OS X version of the game was released in May 2005 by Feral Interactive along with Commandos 2: Men of Courage as part of the Commandos Battle Pack. A remaster of the game, titled Commandos 3 - HD Remaster, was released in August 2022 for Microsoft Windows, Nintendo Switch, PlayStation 4, and Xbox One.

Gameplay
The player controls a group of Commandos that are used to complete missions. Destination Berlin marks the first installment of the Commandos series not to feature the Driver, who is part of the original Commandos team. Natasha (aka "Lips"), who was introduced in Commandos: Beyond The Call of Duty, is also absent. The only available Commandos characters are the Green Beret, the Sniper, the Marine, the Sapper, the Spy, and the Thief.

The gameplay is similar to the previous games, using a "point and click" approach. However, it has fewer hotkeys compared to the previous installment and the user has to press buttons at the bottom of the screen on the action bar.

The player can see all enemies on the map, follow their movements, and make attacks responding to their behaviors. The game has a few differences in playing methods in comparison to previous games of the same series, such as the addition of an assault rifle, a weapon less powerful than a rifle but more powerful than a pistol.  Also, all units can use weapons such as the grenade, rather than just the Sapper as in previous games. The previous "knapsack" setup, simply showing a picture of all the items the currently selected commando has in his possession, superimposed over a picture of a rucksack, has been abandoned in favor of a "box".

When searching enemy bodies or supply crates, a similar but smaller box is shown for their capacity. Commandos such as the Green Beret or Spy, who have only been armed with the regulation pistol in earlier games, can now use almost all the small arms available, except for the sniper rifle. While adding realism (the Commandos are no longer useless outside their area of expertise), some players complain that this robs the Commandos of their roles within the group, making them more generic. This does, however, make the missions less linear because the same job can be done by different Commandos.

The new "cover mode" ability allows the player to leave Commandos waiting at a door or behind cover, ready to shoot at any enemy that comes within range, often more accurately than when controlled manually. This gives the option of ambushes and more defensive tactics.

Commandos 3 is broken down into three campaigns: Central Europe, Normandy, and Stalingrad; each contains various missions, some shorter than others. Each campaign has different players involved. Destination Berlin has a time limit on most missions.

Missions 
Missions:
Basic Training
Advanced Training
Stalingrad campaign:
Eliminate the Sniper
Protect General O'Donnell
Kill the Traitor
Central Europe campaign:
Infiltrate the Station
Board the Train
Stop Bomb Deployment
Get to the Engine
Take Control of the Town
Ambush the Convoy
Normandy campaign:
Cripple Nazi Support
Destroy the Warships
Storm the Beach

Synopsis

Characters
There are six commandos in Commandos 3: the Green Beret (Jack O'Hara), the Sniper (Sir Francis T. Woolridge), the Marine (James Blackwood), the Sapper (Thomas Hancock), the Spy (René Duchamp), and the Thief (Paul Toledo).

Plot
The tutorial begins with Jack O'Hara clearing out a bunker, Sir Francis T. Woolridge killing a few German soldiers with his sniper rifle and Thomas Hancock destroying a Panzer III tank with explosives. The game then shifts to 21 February 1939, where René Duchamp and Paul Toledo infiltrate the German Embassy in London and steal documents from a safe.

Stalingrad
In the Battle of Stalingrad, Woolridge kills an elite German sniper, lifting the siege of a Soviet command post at the Barmaley Fountain. General Franklin O'Donnell then arrives for a meeting with Soviet personnel, accompanied by Hancock and O'Hara. A massive German airstrike ensues followed by airdrops of the Fallschirmjäger. In an effort to protect the General, the commandos repulse waves of infantry attacks including a 7.5 cm Pak 40 anti-tank gun. When the meeting ends, O'Donnell crosses behind German lines and boards a Junkers Ju 52, much to the commandos' confusion. When they too enter the aircraft, O'Donnell orders the Germans to arrest them.

While in an underground prison cell, O'Hara subdues a jail guard and frees Woolridge and Hancock, telling them of O'Donnell's betrayal. When they make their way through the sewers, they run into René Duchamp, who informs them that O'Donnell plans to reveal top-secret information to the Germans. Unknown to the three, Duchamp tells them they are in Berlin. The player is given three tactical ways to kill O'Donnell before a timer initiates, after which he would appear. After O'Donnell's assassination, the four commandos enter a Kübelwagen and escape the capital.

Central Europe
In Saint-Avold, René Duchamp and Paul Toledo board an armoured train carrying stolen artwork but are discovered. The Germans warn the next station and they try to derail the train using explosives. Jack O'Hara discovers this and he single-handedly clears the area before boarding the train just as it passes. Together with Duchamp and Toledo, the three take control of the train. The Germans, however, destroy an incoming railroad bridge, forcing O'Hara to stop the locomotive. Duchamp and Toledo are captured and loaded onto a truck along with the artwork, while O'Hara hides in the back of another truck.

With the German convoy scheduled to pass through a small town in Forbach, Sir Francis T. Woolridge and Thomas Hancock eliminate the town of all German resistance, allowing American soldiers to fortify the area and prepare for their arrival. The convoy arrives escorted by Tiger I tanks but is ambushed as they enter the town. The trucks carrying Duchamp and Toledo are freed and the artwork is recovered.

Normandy
On June 6, 1944, the night before the Normandy landings, Hancock and Toledo infiltrate a German encampment serving as reinforcements near Caen. They destroy a fuel depot, munitions building and as many Tiger I tanks, Schwerer Panzerspähwagen armored cars and Sd.Kfz. 251 half-tracks. At daybreak, James Blackwood infiltrates a port in Le Havre, disabling two German E-boats using mines. As the landings commence, O'Hara joins the Americans as they converge on Omaha Beach. Together, they take out the coastal artillery and clear the bunkers of all German troops.

Reception

Commandos 3 received a "Gold" award from the Asociación Española de Distribuidores y Editores de Software de Entretenimiento (aDeSe), for more than 40,000 sales in Spain during its first 12 months.

Commandos 3 received "average" reviews according to review aggregator Metacritic. The game was criticized for being difficult to play on account of having fewer hotkeys than its predecessors. The player has to control the commandos using the buttons in the pop-up menu at the bottom of the screen. Also, the game is locked at an 800x600 resolution which was relatively low at the time of release.

References

External links
 Official Commandos 3: Destination Berlin website
 
 

2003 video games
MacOS games
Pyro Studios games
Real-time tactics video games
Video games developed in Spain
Video game sequels
Video games set in France
Video games set in Germany
Video games set in London
Video games set in Russia
Video games set in the Soviet Union
Windows games
World War II video games
Feral Interactive games